There is another Town of Lewis in Lewis County, New York.

Lewis is a town in Essex County, New York, United States. The population was 1,382 at the 2010 census. The town is named after Morgan Lewis, the governor of New York at the time the town was established.

The town is in the northeastern quadrant of the county.

History
Settlement began before 1798 near Lewis village.

The town of Lewis was established in 1805 from a section of the town of Willsboro. Part of Lewis was taken in 1844 and 1854 to increase the size of the town of Elizabethtown.

Iron mining was an important early industry. Both Stowersville and Deerhead were communities based on the iron industry.

The First Congregational Church and Cemetery was listed on the National Register of Historic Places in 2005.

Notable person
Joseph Call (born March 31, 1781 near Woodstock, Vermont; died September 20, 1835 in Westport, New York), the "Lewis Giant", was a strongman and wrestler of widespread fame, as well as a postmaster, millwright, logger, town assessor, auditor, justice of the peace, war veteran and teamster.

Geography
The town is drained by tributaries of the Boquet River, flowing east to Lake Champlain.

Lewis is inside the Adirondack Park.

The Northway, Interstate 87, is a major multilane north-south highway, with access from Exit 32 (Stowersville Road). U.S. Route 9 is a north-south highway that passes through the center of town.

The results of Proposition 5 being passed in the November 5 election of 2013 showed New York State to have successfully exchanged 200 acres of land with NYCO Minerals Inc., who will mine said land. The Land was estimated to be worth roughly 1 million dollars.

Demographics

At the 2000 census, there were 1,200 people, 475 households and 341 families residing in the town. The population density was 14.2 per square mile (5.5/km2). There were 620 housing units at an average density of 7.3 per square mile (2.8/km2). The racial makeup of the town was 99.25% White, 0.17% African American, 0.25% Native American, 0.08% from other races, and 0.25% from two or more races. Hispanic or Latino of any race were 0.08% of the population.

There were 475 households, of which 33.9% had children under the age of 18 living with them, 56.0% were married couples living together, 10.7% had a female householder with no husband present, and 28.2% were non-families. 21.3% of all households were made up of individuals, and 6.7% had someone living alone who was 65 years of age or older. The average household size was 2.53 and the average family size was 2.91.

Age distribution was 27.3% under the age of 18, 5.3% from 18 to 24, 29.9% from 25 to 44, 25.9% from 45 to 64, and 11.5% who were 65 years of age or older. The median age was 38 years. For every 100 females, there were 110.2 males. For every 100 females age 18 and over, there were 103.7 males.

The median household income was $36,750, and the median family income was $37,778. Males had a median income of $28,950 versus $21,750 for females. The per capita income for the town was $17,030. About 5.5% of families and 8.1% of the population were below the poverty line, including 11.2% of those under age 18 and 10.2% of those age 65 or over.

Communities and locations in Lewis
Big Pond – A small lake northeast of Lewis village.
Boquet River – A river in the southern part of Lewis.
Crowningshield – A hamlet in the eastern part of the town.
Deerhead – A hamlet in the northern part of the town on NY-9.
Lewis – The hamlet of Lewis is on US-9 at the junction of County Road 10 (Lewis-Wadhams Road), west of Interstate 87, in the southern part of the town.
Stowersville – A hamlet in the southeastern part of the town, east of Interstate 87. Stowersville was an important iron manufacturing location in the 19th century.

References

External links
 Town of Lewis official website
 Lewis early history
 Lewis historical summary

Towns in Essex County, New York